Tatyana Geneleva (born 14 April 1997) is a Kazakhstani professional racing cyclist who rides for Astana Women's Team.

Major results
2015
3rd Individual Pursuit, Track Clubs ACC Cup 
2016
2nd Team Pursuit, Track Clubs ACC Cup (with Nadezhda Geneleva, Faina Potapova and Yekaterina Yuraitis)

See also
 List of 2016 UCI Women's Teams and riders

References

External links
 

1997 births
Living people
Kazakhstani female cyclists
Place of birth missing (living people)
20th-century Kazakhstani women
21st-century Kazakhstani women